Pedro Pinto may refer to:
Pedro Pinto (journalist) (born 1975), Portuguese-American journalist
Pedro Pinto (footballer, born 1994), Portuguese footballer
Pedro Pinto (footballer, born 2000), Portuguese footballer
Pedro Pinto Rubianes (born 1931), Ecuadorian politician